Russett may refer to:

Bruce Russett (born 1935), Dean Acheson Professor of Political Science and Professor in International and Area Studies, MacMillan Center, Yale University
Russett, Maryland, unincorporated planned community near Laurel, Maryland in far-western Anne Arundel County

See also
Rosset (disambiguation)
Rossett
Rousset (disambiguation)
Russet (disambiguation)